Patrick Hoelck (pronounced /hɒl.lɒk/; born September 7, 1968) is an American filmmaker and photographer based in Los Angeles and New York City. He has received considerable recognition as a photographer for fine art and celebrity advertisements. In addition, he has directed several mainstream music videos.

Career 
Hoelck's career began at the young age of sixteen as a music video director in New York City, and later in Los Angeles. Hoelck's self-published photography book, "Tar", was the catalyst for his late-career emergence as a professional photographer. "Tar" consists of several personal short stories and prose entries about Hoelck's early days living in New York City, and his experiences as a drug addict and self-abuser. An early break came for Hoelck when close friend and artist, Vincent Gallo, specially requested Hoelck over the late Richard Avedon for the cover of British magazine, "Flux". Later Hoelck produced "Cigarettes and Coffee" for Paul Thomas Anderson.

Mercy 

Hoelck made his directorial debut in 2009 with the independent romantic drama, Mercy, written and produced by Scott Caan. The movie tells the story of a young novelist who tries to write about love, but realizes he will first need real-life experience to take on the subject.

Polaroid Hotel 

In 2011, Hoelck released a series of Polaroid photos entitled "Polaroid Hotel." The photos were taken over the course of seventeen years, largely at the Standard Hotel in New York City. The series was first a book and later an exhibit, boasting 700 guests on its opening day. In Polaroid Hotel, Hoelck pays tribute to the art of Polaroid photography with a book of images that capture intimate moments of his life and career, showing that just because Polaroid has aged it hasn't lost its appeal. Gisela Getty said about the series, "Hoelck's images seem at first to be random, thrown together, an accidental assemblage, but they provide a narrative of our cultural landscape, a series on contemporary urban life."

Following the series's release, Art in America, one of the country's leading art publications, interviewed Hoelck. In the interview, he speaks to the project's title: "I called it Polaroid Hotel because so many hotels have pictures of nothing on the walls, and I thought it would look so much better if they had Polaroids up instead; the name just stuck."

Photo School

Hoelck and photography peer Michael Muller started a program called Photo School together. Photo School is a series of online tutorial videos that offer aspiring photographers lessons in everything from camera phone photography to complex lighting techniques. Longtime friends, Hoelck and Muller founded Photo School to fill a void in traditional photography education as well as allow a community of photographers at all skill and professional levels to connect and advance their craft.

Projects 
The Grey Organization (founder)
The Grey Organization is dedicated to supporting excellence in the arts through a partnership with filmmakers, both established and unknown, developing material through a collaborative effort for international distribution.

Motion Pictures 
 Cigarettes & Coffee (1993) – Producer
 Mercy (2009) – Director

Videography 
 Alicia Keys – "Girlfriend"
 BB Jay – "Hot Ta' Def"
 Beenie Man – "Dancehall Queen"
 Ben Harper – "Please Bleed"
 Blindside – "All of Us"
 Bonnie McKee – "Sleepwalker"
 Calvin Richardson – "Not Like This"
 Cults – "Go Outside"
 Deftones – "Be Quiet and Drive (Far Away)"
 DJ Quik – "Pitch In on a Party"
 Esthero – "That Girl"
 Glassjaw – "Cosmopolitan Bloodloss"
 Linda Király – "Can't Let Go"
 Lisa Marie Presley – "Dirty Laundry"
 Lisa Marie Presley – "Idiot"
 Local H – "Pack Up the Cats"
 Oliver Peoples 2013 campaign video – Stage 9
 Raven-Symoné – "Double Dutch Bus"
 Skye Sweetnam – "Billy S."
 Yellowcard – "Way Away"

References

External links 

 
 Patrick Hoelck Collections
 Patrick Hotel by Patrick Hoelck
 Hoelck at Krop

American filmmakers
American photographers
Living people
Year of birth missing (living people)